The Philippines is one of the state opponents of the militant group, Islamic State of Iraq and the Levant (ISIL), more commonly referred to by the local media as the Islamic State of Iraq and Syria (ISIS).

ISIL maintains operations in the Philippines through local jihadist groups - Maute group, Abu Sayyaf group, Bangsamoro Islamic Freedom Fighters and Ansar Khalifa Philippines. The groups pledged allegiance to ISIS in 2014 or the following years.

ISIL has been linked to increased suicide bombings by Filipino nationals in 2018 and 2019, a method which has been rarely carried out in the Philippines and the few successfully carried out done by foreigners. Filipinos were suspected to be involved in the 2018 Lamitan, 2019 Jolo Cathedral and Indanan bombings.

Main events timeline

2014 
On July 23, Abu Sayyaf leader Isnilon Hapilon pledged allegiance to ISIL through a video posted on YouTube.  This is an indication of ISIL presence in the Philippines.

2015 
In April, Maute group pledged allegiance to ISIL along with the Ansar Khalifa Philippines terrorist organization, vowing to provide support for each other. The Maute Group was a strong manifestation of the rise of family terrorism in the Philippines.

On November 16, When the APEC Summit was to be held in Manila, a video of men in masks with ISIL black flag behind them is posted on Facebook, claiming "ISIL in Mindanao" will attack the summit.

2017 
May 23

A video discovered on a cellphone seized by AFP during a raid on a safe house in Marawi shows militants including Hapilon and Maute brothers were planning attack on Marawi. The attack was the 4th step for them to gain the approval of the ISIL leadership,"requires the conduct of widespread atrocities and uprisings all across Mindanao."

June 1

Eight foreign militants had been killed in Marawi, five of which they have identified as Malaysian, Indonesian, Saudi Arabian, Yemeni and a Chechen.
 October 16
Isnilon Hapilon and Omar Maute was reportedly killed.

October 19

the Malaysian terrorist Mahmud Ahmad who helped finance the Marawi siege and recruit foreign fighters was killed.

ISIL's support 
In March 2016, training manuals, bandanas with ISIL inscriptions and other documents for militants under the ISIL were recovered after the military captured a Maute group camp, indicating that the group may be trying to link up with ISIL.

On June 21, 2016, ISIL released a video entitled "The Solid Structure" recognized Abu Sayyaf leader Hapilon as the mujahid authorized to lead the jihadists in the Philippines, and designated him as the emir for Southeast Asia. The video also urged aspiring members who can't go to the Middle East to fight for ISIL in the Philippines instead.

In August 2017, another video released by ISIL asks would-be fighters to go to the Philippines, especially the Marawi City where militants are under siege of the government forces.

Filipino members of ISIL

Involvement of Filipino citizens in ISIL has been reported as early as 2014. According to the Daily Mail citing undisclosed Kurdish sources that a Filipino national was among the ISIL members who appeared in a beheading video of American aid worker Peter Kassig and 18 Syrian soldiers uploaded in YouTube. The Philippine military said that the report could not be verified and said that there was no ISIL recruitment in the Philippines at that time. The Department of Foreign Affairs during this time has been receiving unverified reports of Filipinos training to fight for ISIL in Syria.

In June 2016, ISIL released a video where three of its members, a Filipino, an Indonesian and a Malaysian urged aspiring members who can't go to the Middle East to fight for ISIL in the Philippines instead. In January 2017, Rappler reports that the Filipino member was identified as Mohammad Reza Kiram, a 21-year old who was the first verified member in ISIL fighting in Syria.

Affiliate groups in the Philippines
The following Philippine-based militant groups have pledged allegiance to ISIL.

 Ansar Khalifa Philippines
 Abu Sayyaf
 Maute group
 Bangsamoro Islamic Freedom Fighters

Non-state opponents of ISIL in the Philippines
Aside from the Philippine government, ISIL and its affiliate groups in the Philippines has received armed opposition from other local groups in the Philippines.

 Moro Islamic Liberation Front
 Moro National Liberation Front

Related clashes 

The following are the list of battle and clashes involving the jihadist groups since they respectively pledged allegiance to ISIS:
 January 2015 Mamasapano clash
 2016 Butig clashes
 April 2016 Battle of Tipo-Tipo
 Summer 2016 Sulu and Basilan Clashes
 January 2017 Kidapawan jail siege (suspected involvement)
 May 2017 Bohol clashes
 May 2017 Battle of Marawi

Related terrorist incidents 

 2014 Bukidnon bus bombing (suspected involvement of BIFF)
 2016 Davao City bombing (suspected involvement of Maute Group)
2018 Isulan bombings (suspected involvement of BIFF)
2018 Lamitan bombing (suspected involvement of Abu Sayyaf)

Public opinion on ISIL
In a poll conducted between February 16 to May 8, 2017, the Pew Research Center says that 70% among the Filipinos questioned view ISIL as a major threat to the Philippines ahead of global climate change (65%) and cyberattacks (64%).

Casualties 
The chart below gives the information of casualties since the jihadist groups respectively pledged allegiance to ISIS.

Note: Some casualties from small-scale conflicts or terrorist incidents are not given.

References 

Islamic State of Iraq and the Levant and the Philippines